Chris Apple (born April 9, 1970 in Millersville, Pennsylvania, United States) is a former professional soccer player and coach. He attended the University of Rochester from 1988 to 1992, where he played midfield. He led his team to three University Athletic Association Championships, and three NCAA tournament appearances. After graduating, he played professionally for SpVgg Weiden in Germany and later for the Raleigh Flyers.

He started his coaching career as an assistant soccer coach at Harvard College, which he coached in 1993. In 1994, he became the head men's soccer coach at North Carolina Wesleyan College. From 1994 to 1995, he led the team to a 12-20-1 record. From 1996 to 1999, he served as an assistant coach at the University of Notre Dame. In 2000, he became the head men's soccer coach at Notre Dame, posting a 7-8-2 record in his only season there. He was replaced by Bobby Clark. Chris Apple has been the head men's soccer coach at his alma mater, the University of Rochester, since 2001.  In his nine years at the University, his teams have won four ECAC Northeast Regional Championships, four UAA Championships, and made five NCAA appearances. He has coached the Yellowjackets to a cumulative 123-29-21 record while walking the sidelines.

External links
Grfx.cstv.com
Und.com

Notre Dame Fighting Irish men's soccer coaches
Living people
1970 births
University of Rochester alumni
People from Millersville, Pennsylvania
Harvard Crimson men's soccer coaches
American soccer coaches